In linguistics, Heaps' law (also called Herdan's law) is an empirical law which describes the number of distinct words in a document (or set of documents) as a function of the document length (so called type-token relation). It can be formulated as

where VR is the number of distinct words in an instance text of size n. K and β are free parameters determined empirically. With English text corpora, typically K is between 10 and 100, and β is between 0.4 and 0.6.

Under mild assumptions, the Herdan–Heaps law is asymptotically equivalent to Zipf's law concerning the frequencies of individual words within a text. This is a consequence of the fact that the type-token relation (in general) of a homogenous text can be derived from the distribution of its types.

Heaps' law means that as more instance text is gathered, there will be diminishing returns in terms of discovery of the full vocabulary from which the distinct terms are drawn.

Heaps' law also applies to situations in which the "vocabulary" is just some set of distinct types which are attributes of some collection of objects. For example, the objects could be people, and the types could be country of origin of the person. If persons are selected randomly (that is, we are not selecting based on country of origin), then Heaps' law says we will quickly have representatives from most countries (in proportion to their population) but it will become increasingly difficult to cover the entire set of countries by continuing this method of sampling.
Heaps' law has been observed also in single-cell transcriptomes considering genes as the distinct objects in the "vocabulary".

See also

 Zipf's law 
 Brevity law
 Menzerath's law
 Bradford's law
 Benford's law
 Pareto distribution
 Principle of least effort
 Rank-size distribution

References

Citations

Sources

 .
 .
 
 .
.
 .
 .

External links

Computational linguistics
Statistical laws
Empirical laws
Eponyms